AIDAbella is a cruise ship operated by AIDA Cruises. Built at Meyer Werft shipyard in Papenburg, Germany, she is a sister ship to AIDAdiva and AIDAluna. The ship has a passenger capacity of over 2,050. The name AIDAbella was chosen after a competition to name the new ship. The name was meant to signify how beautiful the ship is.

Facilities
The ship has 1,025 passenger cabins. There is a nude sunbathing area towards the rear of the ship. Amidships is a circular, glass-walled, and roofed Theatrium in the center of the ship.

References

External links

Official AIDAbella website 

Ships built in Papenburg
Ships of AIDA Cruises
2007 ships